Andrew II (died 1462 in Rome) was a Franciscan priest who served as an archbishop of Bar in the mid-15th century.

In 1448, Pope Nicholas V appointed Andrew II as Archbishop of Antivari in Rome.

Under Andrew's permission, the Church of Saint Nicholas near the fortification of the city of Antivari was given to Conventual Franciscans, and there they built a monastery.

In the course of the year 1450, Andrew II served as Skanderbeg's ambassador to the Pope. Two years later, Andrew participated in the reconciliation between the Albanian Dukagjini and Kastrioti clans in Dyrrhachium.

In 1459, Andrew resigned as Archbishop and relocated himself to Rome, where he died in 1462.

1462 deaths
Archbishops of Antivari
15th-century Roman Catholic archbishops in Serbia
Italian Franciscans
Year of birth unknown